Miss France 2019 was the 89th edition of the Miss France pageant, held on 15 December 2018 at the Zénith de Lille in Lille. The competition was hosted by Jean-Pierre Foucault, Sylvie Tellier, and Miss France 2018 Maëva Coucke, while singer and actress Line Renaud served as president of the jury. 

Maëva Coucke of Nord-Pas-de-Calais crowned her successor Vaimalama Chaves of Tahiti at the end of the event.

Background
On 23 April 2018, it was announced by the Miss France Organisation that Miss France 2019 would take place at Zénith de Lille in Lille, Nord-Pas-de-Calais. The thirty contestants had an international trip to Mauritius, where they were tested in a variety of competitions, before rehearsals for the pageant began in Lille. On 17 November, Line Renaud was confirmed as the president of the jury for the competition, while it was announced that for the first time the jury will consist of solely women.

Results

Special awards

Scoring

Preliminaries 

A jury composed of partners (internal and external) of the Miss France Committee selected twelve delegates during an interview that took place on 12 December to advance to the semifinals.

Top twelve 
In the top twelve, a 50/50 split vote between the official jury and voting public selected five delegates to advance to the top five. Each delegate was awarded an overall score of 1 to 12 from the jury and public, and the five delegates with the highest combined scores advanced to the top five. The girls with the sixth and seventh highest combined scores were afterwards designated as the fifth and sixth runners-up, respectively, despite not advancing in the competition.

Top five 
In the top five, public voting determined which delegate is declared Miss France.

Pageant

Format
The theme for this year's competition was "The Misses Put on a Show", with competition rounds inspired by various popular forms of entertainment. Like in previous years, the thirty contestants were first divided into three groups of ten, with each group taking part in an initial presentation round. The three presentation rounds were themed after cabaret, Bollywood, and the circus, respectively. Afterwards, the thirty contestants competed in the one-piece swimsuit round, inspired by Old Hollywood, which featured guest appearances from former Miss France winners Camille Cerf, Flora Coquerel, and 2019 competition judge Laury Thilleman. Following the one-piece swimsuit round, the contestants changed into ballgowns and the top twelve was announced. After the announcement of the top twelve, the twelve semi-finalists competed in the second swimsuit round, inspired by superheroes and featuring a guest appearance from current Miss France Maëva Coucke. Following the swimsuit competition, the top five was announced. The top five then participated in the final fashion show round, inspired by showgirls. Afterwards, they participated in the final question round. The five finalists then completed their final walks, before Miss France 2019 and her four runners-up were crowned by Coucke and Line Renaud, president of the jury.

Judges
For the first time ever, the jury consisted of solely women.
Line Renaud (President of the Jury) – singer and actress
Maud Baecker – actress and comedian
Caroline Garcia – tennis player
Jenifer – singer and actress
Alice Renavand – ballet dancer
Claudia Tagbo – comedian
Laury Thilleman – Miss France 2011 from Brittany

Contestants

Notes

References

External links

December 2018 events in France
Miss France
2018 beauty pageants